René-Antoine Pelletier (2 September 1908 – 30 March 1993) was a station agent and a Canadian federal political politician.

Political career
Pelletier was first elected to the House of Commons of Canada in the 1935 Canadian federal election. He ran as a Social Credit candidate defeated incumbent Member of Parliament Donald MacBeth Kennedy. He served 1 term in office before defeated in the 1940 Canadian federal election by Liberal candidate John Sissons. Pelletier ran in that election as a candidate for the New Democracy party.

He died in 1993 and was buried at Our Lady of Good Hope Roman Catholic, Hope Cemetery.

References

External links
 

Members of the House of Commons of Canada from Alberta
Social Credit Party of Canada MPs
New Democracy (Canada) candidates in the 1940 Canadian federal election
People from Laurentides
1908 births
1993 deaths